English Phonetics and Phonology: An Introduction is a book by Philip Carr in which the author provides an introduction to the phonological structure of the English language. It is a very popular textbook.

Reception
The book was reviewed by Dominic Watt, Marc Picard, Bert Botma and Georgios P. Georgiou.

References

External links
English Phonetics and Phonology: An Introduction

Phonology books
Linguistics textbooks
Wiley-Blackwell books
1999 non-fiction books